Andelva is a  river that runs through Eidsvoll, Norway. It flows from the lake Hurdalssjøen at Eidsvoll Verk to the river Vorma in the town center of Eidsvoll.

There are fifteen fish species registered in the river, with good fishing possibilities. The river is protected from 15 September to 1 May.

Eidsvoll
Rivers of Viken
Rivers of Norway